N9ve is the eighth album by Brazilian singer, songwriter, arranger, producer Ana Carolina. Launched in 2009, the album received a certified Gold record in Brazil by ABPD due by more than 50 000 copies sold in the country.

Promotion and world tour 
The tour starts on September 9, 2009 – the day the singer full 35 years – at Citibank Hall, Rio de Janeiro. On August 22, 2009 Ana sang the album's first single, glances at the "Criança Espernaça". A note on the official site of the singer announced that the start date of the tour will no longer be September 9 and, later, the fan club Donana Carolina released through the site, Twitter and his blog the event dates.

Nove World Tour

The tour of "N9ve" began on November 14, in São Paulo and so far she has gone through several cities in Brazil and Europe such as Barcelona, Paris, Madrid, Rome and Zurich.

Track list

Certifications

References

See also
List of number-one albums of 2009 (Brazil)

2009 albums